The Christoffelberg, also known as Mt Christoffel or Mt St Christoffel, named after Saint Christopher, is the highest point on Curaçao.

See also 
 Tafelberg, in the south-east of Curaçao

References

External links
Picture of the Christoffelberg
Pictures, description

Landforms of Curaçao